Or Prasat is a commune (khum) of Mongkol Borei District in Banteay Meanchey Province in western Cambodia.

Villages

Phnum Thum Tboung
 Phnum Prasat
 Phnum Thum Cheung
 Chamkar Louk
 Phnum Thum Thmei
 Anlong Sdei
 Kouk Thnong Kaeut
 Kouk Thnong Kandal
 Ou Snguot
 Ou Prasat
 Kouk Ampil
 Ra Chamkar Chek
 Pou Rieng
 Rung Krabau

References

Communes of Banteay Meanchey province
Mongkol Borey District